Lister v Hesley Hall Ltd [2001] UKHL 22 is an English tort law case, creating a new precedent for finding where an employer is vicariously liable for the torts of their employees. Prior to this decision, it had been found that sexual abuse by employees of others could not be seen as in the course of their employment, precluding recovery from the employer. The majority of the House of Lords however overruled the Court of Appeal, and these earlier decisions, establishing that the "relative closeness" connecting the tort and the nature of an individual's employment established liability.

Facts
A boarding house (Axeholme House) for Wilsic Hall School, in Doncaster was opened in 1979; the principal students to live there having behavioural and emotional difficulties. The claimants in the instant case had resided there between the years 1979 to 1982, being aged 12 to 15 during this time, under the care of a warden, who was in charge of maintaining discipline and the running of the house. The warden lived at the house also, with his disabled wife, and together they were the only two members of staff in the house. His duties were ensuring order, in making sure the children went to bed, went to school, engaged in evening activities, and supervising other staff. It had been alleged by some of the boys that the warden had sexually abused them, including inappropriate advances and taking trips alone with them. A criminal investigation took place some ten years later, resulting in the warden being sentenced to seven years imprisonment; following this, the victims brought an action for personal injury against the employers, alleging they were vicariously liable.

Judgment
T v North Yorkshire CC, decided just two years earlier by the Court of Appeal, had found that a headmaster's sexual abuse of a child on a field trip was not within the scope of his employment, a previous criterion by which an employer could be found vicariously liable. This was the view taken prior to the House of Lords appeal, but was reversed, with Lord Steyn making the leading judgment. Here, he cited a recent Canadian case, which had imposed liability for intentional torts, creating a new test of 'close connection', rather than using previous formulations:

This decision is significant in the Lords' assessment of the Salmond test for vicarious liability as inadequate. The previous test had been framed as follows:

The Lords' new assessment was summarised as such:

This new test of close connection has been described as 'fairer', and of greater use to claimants. Lord Clyde stated three principles in his judgment which he felt should be considered:

 in considering the scope of the employment, a broad approach should be adopted;
 while consideration of the time and place at which the acts occurred will always be relevant, they may not be conclusive; and
 while the employment enables the employee to be present at a particular time and place, the opportunity of being present at particular premises whereby the employee has been able to perform the act in question does not mean that the act is necessarily within the scope of the employment.

Of importance is that the employment status of an individual cannot merely have provided the employee with an opportunity to commit a tort. There must be a connection between the duties of an employee and the tort committed, as restated in the subsequent case of Dubai Aluminium Co Ltd v Salaam, involving deceit and theft.

Developments

Following this expansion of liability, employers have been found liable in subsequent cases for intentional torts of their employees. In Mattis v Pollock vicarious liability was found where a bouncer, intent on revenge, stabbed a patron of the night club at which he worked. Dubai Aluminium Co Ltd v Salaam established liability for fraud of employees, where it is outside their duties or authority to make certain representations.

See also
 T v North Yorkshire CC
 Vicarious liability in English law
 English tort law
 Bazley v Curry [1999] 2 SCR 534

References

Bibliography
 
 

English tort case law
English vicarious liability case law
House of Lords cases
2001 in case law
2001 in British law